Dhruva is a 2002 Kannada action drama film directed and co-written by M. S. Ramesh along with R. Rajashekar. The film features Darshan and Sherin in the lead roles whilst Om Puri plays an important role.

The film featured original score and films he done soundtrack composed by Gurukiran.

Cast 
 Darshan as Dhruva
 Sherin as Rashmi 
 Om Puri as Pratap Singh
 Avinash as MLA Shambhulingappa 
 H. G. Dattatreya
 Anantha Velu as a politician
Ravi Chethan 
Hamsa 
Kavana 
Dharma as Anil Raj
Rajeev Rathod 
Shankar Bhat 
M. S. Umesh
Krishne Gowda 
NGEF Ramamurthy 
 Sumithra
 Bullet Prakash
 Sadhu Kokila
 P. N. Sathya
 Dattaa Manjeshwar

Production 
Darshan shot for this film around the same time as Kariya.

Soundtrack 
The music was composed by Gurukiran for Ashwini Audio label.

References

External links 
Viggy Review (in Kannada)

2002 films
2002 action drama films
2000s Kannada-language films
Indian action drama films
Films scored by Gurukiran